Ward Belt (originally known as Ward's Belt) is a locality to the west of Gawler in South Australia. The area was named after James Ward and his wife, who arrived in South Australia in the Olivia in 1853. The area is predominantly used for grain, beef and sheep farming.

When the Max Fatchen Expressway was completed in 2011, it divided Buchfelde so the portion north of the expressway was reassigned to Ward Belt. This included the area of the Gawler Aerodrome which was formerly in Buchfelde but is now in Ward Belt.

Primitive Methodist Chapel
The foundation stone for the Primitive Methodist chapel at Ward's Belt was laid on 26 February 1874. The land and building materials for the chapel were  donated by Mr James Sparshott J.P. The chapel opened on 26 April the same year. The chapel was renovated in 1894. The chapel was pulled down in 1926. Sparshott is buried in the small cemetery that is all that remains of the chapel.

Hotel
There had also been a hotel at Ward Belt, although it was very run down in 1912.

References

Towns in South Australia